Little Ponderosa is a census-designated place (CDP) in Beaver County, Oklahoma, United States. Within the Oklahoma Panhandle, it was first listed as a CDP after the 2010 census.

The CDP is in the northwest corner of Beaver County, on the west side of U.S. Routes 83 and 270.

Demographics

References 

Census-designated places in Beaver County, Oklahoma
Census-designated places in Oklahoma